A total of 433 competitors competed for Australia at the 2008 Summer Olympics in Beijing. The team was Australia's second largest away team after the 2004 Summer Olympics in Athens, which included a team of 482 competitors.  Australian athletes have competed in every Summer Olympic Games of the modern era.

In addition to competitors, 418 officials and 38 medical personnel were part of the Australian team.  Australia competed in 26 of the 28 Olympic program sports; they failed to qualify in baseball and team handball. Australia also sent a men's but not a women's football (soccer) squad, and had two beach volleyball but no indoor volleyball teams competing.

Medalists

Archery

Australia had two archers earn qualification spots at the 2007 World Outdoor Target Championships and three earn spots at the Oceania continental championship. David Barnes and Sky Kim earned the men two spots at the World tournament, with Michael Naray earning a third spot, and the team qualification at the Oceania competition. Jade Lindsey and Jane Waller were the qualifying women at the Oceania tournament.

In making its final selections, Australia selected Kim and Naray along with Matthew Gray for the men's team, and Waller and Lexie Feeney for the women's team.

Men

Women

Athletics

Australia sent 40 representatives to compete in athletics events. 22 of these men competed in track events, ten in field events, seven in race walking, four in the marathons and one in combined events. The athletics did not start until the 15th of August, day seven of competition.

On day one of athletics, two finals were held but no Australians qualified to compete in either. On the second day of athletics, Australia won their first Olympic Medal for athletics in 2008. This person was Jared Tallent, an Olympic debutant, who competed in the men's 20kilometre race walk. Tallent came third, only 15second in front of fellow countryman Luke Adams who finished 6th. On the third day of competition, four Australians competed, three in medal events.

Men
Track & road events

Field events

Women
Track & road events

Field events

Combined events – Heptathlon

Notes

Badminton

Australia sent a team of six to Beijing. Stuart Gomez competed in the men's singles, while Erin Carroll competed in women's singles. Ross Smith and Glenn Warfe competed in the men's doubles and Tania Luiz and Eugenia Tanaka competed in the women's doubles.

Basketball

Australia's men's basketball team qualified for the Olympics by defeating New Zealand in a best-of-three series to win the FIBA Oceania Championship 2007. The women's team automatically qualified as the reigning world champions after winning the 2006 FIBA World Championship for Women.

Men's tournament

Roster

Group play

Quarterfinals

Women's tournament

Roster

Group play

Quarterfinals

Semifinals

Gold medal match

Boxing

Australia had nine boxers qualify for the Olympics. All qualified at the Oceanian qualifying tournament.

Canoeing

Slalom

Sprint
Men

Women

Qualification Legend: QS = Qualify to semi-final; QF = Qualify directly to final

Cycling

Australia selected competitors in all four cycling disciplines – BMX, mountain biking, road racing and track racing. Mountain biker Chris Jongewaard lost his legal appeal to be included in the team after being excluded because of a car accident, involving another cyclist for which he was due to face court in late 2008.

Road
Men

Women

Track
Sprint

* Qualified only in the first round

Pursuit

Keirin

Omnium

Mountain biking

BMX

Diving

Australia selected a team of nine divers to compete at the 2008 Olympics:

Men

Women

Equestrian

Australia selected a team of twelve equestrians to compete at the 2008 Olympics. Hayley Beresford, Kristy Oatley and Heath Ryan competed in dressage. Edwina Alexander, Laurie Lever, Peter McMahon and Matt Williams were selected for the jumping competition. Clayton Fredericks, Lucinda Fredericks, Sonja Johnson, Megan Jones and Shane Rose were selected for the three-day event.

Dressage

Eventing

# - Indicates that points do not count in team total
* Only three riders are eligible to qualify for the jumping final.

Show jumping

Fencing

Two fencers will represent Australia in Beijing. Jo Halls will contest the women's individual foil while Amber Parkinson will contest the women's individual épée.

Women

Field hockey

The Australian men's and women's field hockey teams both qualified for Beijing. The men's team won the bronze medal, while the women's team finished in 5th place for the tournament.

Men's tournament

Roster

Group play
The top two teams from each group advanced to the semifinals.

Semifinal

Bronze medal match

Women's tournament

Roster

Group play
The top two teams from each group advanced to the semifinals.  Australia were eliminated on goal difference with China and entered the playoff for 5th/6th place.

Classification match for 5th/6th place

Football (soccer)

Men's tournament

Australia's under-23 football team, commonly referred to as the 'Olyroos', qualified for the 2008 Summer Olympics.

Roster

Group play

Gymnastics

Australian gymnasts qualified for Beijing in all three categories: artistic, rhythmic and trampoline. Naazmi Johnston was the only rhythmic gymast to qualify. Ben Wilden was the only trampolinist selected in the squad and Samuel Simpson was the only male artistic gymnast but a full women's artistic gymnastic team of six qualified:

Artistic
Men

Women

Individual finals

Rhythmic

Trampoline

Judo

Australia has selected a team of 13 for the 2008 Games:

Men

Women

Modern pentathlon 

Alexander Parygin, who won Olympic gold in Atlanta while competing for Kazakhstan, was initially due to be Australia's only male competitor in the modern pentathlon. His qualification was overturned "on technical grounds" by the Court of Arbitration for Sport, when the Modern Pentathlon Association of Great Britain argued that he had failed to meet "eligibility criteria of 5,100 points at the relevant international competition, during the Olympic qualification period". Specifically, Parygin qualified for Beijing during a competition which lacked the equestrian event. There being no avenue of appeal, Parygin will not compete in Beijing.

Angie Darby made her Olympic debut as the only Australian female in the competition. Darby, having qualified in the same conditions as Parygin, had her participation in the Games open to question, but she eventually competed.

Rowing

For the first time, Australia qualified for every rowing event at an Olympics.

Men

Women

Qualification Legend: FA=Final A (medal); FB=Final B (non-medal); FC=Final C (non-medal); FD=Final D (non-medal); FE=Final E (non-medal); FF=Final F (non-medal); SA/B=Semifinals A/B; SC/D=Semifinals C/D; SE/F=Semifinals E/F; QF=Quarterfinals; R=Repechage

Sailing

Australia competed in ten of the eleven sailing events.

Men

Women

Open

M = Medal race; EL = Eliminated – did not advance into the medal race; CAN = Race cancelled; OCS = On the course side of the starting line; BFD – Black flag disqualification; DNF – Did not finish

Shooting

Australia has selected a squad of seventeen sport shooters to contest the 2008 Olympic competition:

Men

Women

Softball

The Australian softball team has qualified for the 2008 Summer Olympics. The team selected to compete in the games is:

Jodie Bowering
Kylie Cronk
Kelly Hardie
Tanya Harding
Sandy Lewis
Simmone Morrow
Tracey Mosley
Stacey Porter
Melanie Roche
Justine Smethurst
Danielle Stewart
Natalie Titcume
Natalie Ward
Belinda Wright
Kerry Wyborn

Group stage
The top four teams will advance to the semifinal round.

Semifinal

Preliminary final

Swimming

Australia sent 43 swimmers to Beijing. The men's team won 3 silver and 3 bronze medals, while the women's team won 6 gold, 2 silver and 4 bronze medals and set 4 world records. The members of the swim team and their results were:

Men

* Competed in the heats only

Women

* Competed in the heats only

Synchronised swimming

Australia has qualified both a duet and a group entry in synchronised swimming.

Table tennis

Australia has qualified both men's and women's table tennis teams for Beijing. Each team includes three competitors. The men's team is Kyle Davis, William Henzell and David Zalcberg. The women's team is Lay Jian Fang, Miao Miao and Stephanie Sang Xu.

Men's singles

Women's singles

Team

Taekwondo

Four Australians have qualified for the Beijing Olympics. Ryan Carneli will compete in the men's under 58 kg division and Burak Hasan in the men's 58–68 kg division. Carmen Marton will compete in the women's over 67 kg division and Tina Morgan in the women's 57–67 kg division.

Tennis

Australia has qualified two men and three women for the singles competition in Beijing while two doubles pairs have qualified in each of the men's and women's draws. The team is:

Men

Women

Triathlon

Five Australians were selected to compete in the triathlon at the 2008 Olympics. Courtney Atkinson and Brad Kahlefeldt will contest the men's competition while Erin Densham, Emma Moffatt and Emma Snowsill will battle it out for the women's title.

Volleyball

Beach
Two teams qualified for the Olympics: the women's team Barnett-Cook (Tamsin Barnett and Natalie Cook), and the men's team Schacht-Slack (Andrew Schacht and Joshua Slack).

Water polo

Australia participated in both the men's and the women's tournaments. The men's team finished in 8th place, while the women's team won the bronze medal. Australia's squads included three sets of siblings: Jamie and Gemma Beadsworth, the Santoromito sisters and the Rippon sisters. Kate Gynther is also a stepsister of the Rippons. (Bronwen and Emma Knox are unrelated.)

Men's tournament

Roster

Group play

All times are China Standard Time (UTC+8).

Classification round
Classification semi-final

Classification 7th–8th

Women's tournament

Roster

Group play

All times are China Standard Time (UTC+8).

Semifinal

Bronze medal game

Weightlifting

Two Australians will compete in the weightlifting at Beijing. Damon Kelly will lift in the men's over 105 kg class and Deborah Lovely in women's over 75 kg class.

Wrestling 

Four wrestlers represented Australia at the 2008 Games:. None of them made it past the qualification round.

Men's freestyle

Men's Greco-Roman

Women's freestyle

Media coverage 
In Australia, both the Seven Network and SBS TV provided television coverage of the games. Live web video streaming of selected events was provided by Yahoo!7. Radio station 2GB held the exclusive Sydney radio rights through the Seven Network, while in other capital cities commercial partners were joined by ABC Local Radio in providing radio coverage. Additionally, Telstra broadcast Seven's coverage and that of selected events to 3G mobile phones via the Next G network.

An estimated eight million viewers in Australia watched the televised broadcast of the Opening Ceremony, the largest number ever, surpassing that of the 2000 Sydney Olympics opening ceremony. Seven was the only network to televise the Opening Ceremony in Australia.

Seven has been criticised for broadcasting Australian Football League games in lieu of Olympic events with Australian athletes in contention for medals, as well as for the quality of their coverage in general. The network cited existing contractual obligations for their AFL scheduling. In response, the AFL made concessions to Seven that allowed more Olympics coverage to be broadcast in certain markets.

During the closing days of the games, Seven and the rival Nine Network engaged in a "bidding war" to secure athletes, particularly gold medalists, for exclusive contracts to appear on their respective programs. Stephanie Rice signed a $800,000 two-year contract with Seven, and as a result withdrew (along with several other athletes) from being filmed for Nine's 60 Minutes hours before the show. Both networks are fighting for the lead in the Australian television ratings and, whilst Seven has broadcast the last several Olympics, Nine will be co-broadcasting with Foxtel the 2012 Summer Olympics in London.

The International Olympic Committee later awarded Seven its Golden Rings Award for "Best Olympic Programme". The award is given for the best overall Olympic coverage.

See also
 Australia at the 2006 Commonwealth Games
 Australia at the 2008 Summer Paralympics
 Australia at the 2010 Commonwealth Games

External links
 Official website of Australia's team for the Beijing Olympics

References

Nations at the 2008 Summer Olympics
2008
Summer Olympics